Shavian is a proposed phonetic alphabet for English.

Shavian may also refer to:
 Shavian (Unicode block), the Unicode character set block for the phonetic alphabet
 Shavian (horse), a British racehorse
 Shavian, associated with George Bernard Shaw